M5 is a sloop-rigged super yacht launched in 2003 as Mirabella V. She is the largest single-masted yacht ever built.

Ownership
Mirabella V was built as part of a fleet of large sailing yachts used for luxury private charters by Joseph Vittoria, former Chairman and CEO of the Avis car rental company. She was named after Vittoria's previous yachts.

Mirabella V now belongs to Rodney Lewis and has been renamed M5.  It is no longer available for charters.

Design
The owner specifications combined fast sailing with motoryacht amenities. The righting moment of sailing vessels makes them more seakindly than powerboats and M5 has achieved speeds in excess of 19 knots in 8 1/2 ft seas. To achieve the amenity requirements, a single mast was preferred to other rig types in order to maximize interior volumes in keel-stepped sailing yachts; To achieve the performance requirements, the higher aspect ratio of the single mast sail plan was also preferred in order to provide a better speed potential. A final demand was that the yacht be able to use the harbour at Palm Beach, Florida. This required the use of a lifting keel to reduce draft.

Mirabella V was designed by yacht designer Ron Holland. Load and structural calculations of the hull and rig were carried out by Hamble-based firm High Modulus Europe Ltd, (now part of Gurit).

Technical challenges
While vessels of M5s size are typically made from steel or aluminium, an aramid foam core/vinylester sandwich build was chosen to achieve a shorter delivery date, reduced maintenance (regular repainting to inhibit corrosion is not required) and better acoustic thermal insulation.

Historically, large yachts were built with more than one mast in order to divide the sail area for easier handling. Today's technologies in spars, rigging, sailmaking, powered winches and electronics enable rigs with larger sail areas, higher aspect ratios, larger loads and simpler handling, allowing Mirabella V to be constructed with the tallest mast and largest jib of any sailing craft ever built at the time. One of the procurement challenges was finding sheets strong enough to trim the sails.

Construction
Mirabella V was constructed at the former BVT Surface Fleet yard (formerly VT Shipbuilding formerly Vosper Thornycroft) at its Woolston Yard, Southampton, Hampshire. Luciana Vittoria specified to naval architect Ron Holland her wishes for interior decoration. After changing hands and being rechristened M5, she was handed over for refit to the Pendennis Shipyard in March 2013. She was relaunched in September 2013 with an extended stern and reverse transom, a lighter ballast arrangement and carbon fibre standing rigging.

Particulars of ship
LOA:  (2013)
LWL (full load): 
Beam: 
Displacement (half load): 
Ballast:  (2013)
Draught (keel up)  (2013)
Draught (keel down):  (2013)
Air draught:  (cannot pass under any bridge that she can navigate to)
Sail area (mainsail+working jib): 
Sail area (mainsail+reacher): 
her  UPS genoa is the World's largest sail, excluding spinnakers.

Accommodation
The boat has a master suite on the main deck and six cabins for as many as 12 guests. The boat's lazarette stores a  tender, Lasers, jet skis, ski boats, kayaks and three remote-controlled models of Mirabella V. The foredeck has two recesses that serve as swimming pools and as storage for two launches.

Launch
Mirabella V was launched on 27 November 2003 and her mast was stepped at the Southampton Empress Dock on 30 December 2003. Her first sea trial took place off Portsmouth on 14 April 2004.

Charter
Under Vittoria's ownership, Mirabella V was chartered for up to $420,000 per week and about 12 weeks per year, with a balanced operating budget if chartered for 14 weeks per year.

Service
After dragging anchor and running aground in Beaulieu-sur-Mer on 16 September 2004, Mirabella V was towed into La Ciotat for a survey and subsequently returned to Vosper Thornycroft in Portsmouth for repairs.

See also
List of large sailing yachts
Comparison of large sloops

References

Notes

Citations

Individual sailing vessels
Ships built in Southampton
Ships built in Portsmouth
2003 ships
2000s sailing yachts
Sailboat type designs by Ron Holland
Sailing yachts built in the United Kingdom